Pedro "Pit" Passarell (born 11 April 1968) is an Argentinian-born Brazilian musician who is the bassist, main composer and occasional lead vocalist of heavy metal band Viper. He also writes for the rock band Capital Inicial, that his brother Yves Passarell joined after leaving Viper.

Discography with Viper

Albums 
 The Killera Sword (demo tape, 1985)
 Soldiers of Sunrise (1987)
 Theatre of Fate (1989)
 Evolution (1992)
 Vipera Sapiens (EP, 1992)
 Maniacs in Japan (live album, 1993)
 Coma Rage (1995)
 Tem Pra Todo Mundo (1996)
 Everybody Everybody (compilation, 1999)
 All My Life (June 2007)

Documentaries 
 20 Years Living for the Night (2005)

References 

1968 births
Living people
English-language singers from Brazil
Brazilian bass guitarists
Male bass guitarists
Brazilian composers
Brazilian heavy metal singers
People from Buenos Aires
Argentine emigrants to Brazil
Viper (band) members